Cizara ardeniae, the coprosma hawk moth, is a moth of the family Sphingidae. The species was first described by John Lewin in 1805.

Distribution 
It is known from the eastern coastal region of Australia and New Zealand.

Description 
The wingspan is about 60 mm. Adults are dark brown, with white edges to the wings and white bars across the wings and abdomen. The ends of the white bar show as transparent windows on the wings. In resting position, these bars are aligned on each side to form a single stripe. The underside has tufts of bright red hair.

Biology 
The larvae have been recorded feeding on various Rubiaceae species, including Coprosma repens, Coprosma quadrifida, Coprosma lucida and Myrmecodia beccarii. Early instars are translucent green with a black horn on the tail and a yellowish head. Later instars are opaque green with two yellow stripes running along the length of the body and a blue head. The tail horn becomes blue. When disturbed, it lashes its head violently from side to side. In the last instar, the coloration changes to diagonal patches of light and dark brown. Pupation takes place on the soil surface under a mat of felt that the larva spins amongst dead leaves.

References

Macroglossini
Moths described in 1805
Moths of New Zealand